Fresh Horses is the sixth studio album by American country music artist Garth Brooks. It was released on November 21, 1995. Fresh Horses peaked at number two on the Billboard 200 chart, and number one on the Top Country Albums chart.

The album had a worldwide radio ban until it was available to buy. Only the two singles issued ("She's Every Woman" and "The Fever") were allowed to be played before this date, the latter of which was a new country-rock version of a 1993 Aerosmith song. In 2020 it was certified 8× Platinum by the RIAA, signifying 8 million copies shipped in the US, making it his only pre-Chris Gaines studio album to not be certified diamond or higher.

Background
Brooks commented on the album, saying:

Track listing

“The Limited Series” (1998) version of the album inserted a cover of  Bob Dylan’s “To Make You Feel My Love” between tracks 7 and 8. This cover was originally part of the soundtrack to Hope Floats.

Personnel 
Susan Ashton – backing vocals on "She's Every Woman"
Sam Bacco – percussion on "She's Every Woman"
Bruce Bouton – pedal steel guitar except "The Fever"
Garth Brooks – lead and backing vocals
Mark Casstevens – acoustic guitar except "The Fever"
Charles Cochran – string arrangements on "That Ol' Wind" and "The Change"
Mike Chapman – bass guitar
Ed Foote – hurdy-gurdy on "Ireland"
Rob Hajacos – fiddle except "The Change" and "She's Every Woman"
Gordon Kennedy – electric guitar on "The Old Stuff" and "The Fever"
Chris Leuzinger – electric guitar
Milton Sledge – drums; percussion on "The Fever" and "Ireland"
Bobby Wood – keyboards except "The Fever"
Trisha Yearwood – backing vocals on "The Old Stuff", "Cowboys and Angels", "Rollin'", "The Beaches of Cheyenne" and "It's Midnight Cinderella"
Nashville String Machine - string orchestra on "That Ol' Wind" and "The Change"

Charts
Fresh Horses peaked at number two on the US Billboard 200, and number one on the Top Country Albums, becoming his sixth Country number-one album. Fresh Horses has been 
certified 8× Platinum by the RIAA.

Weekly charts

Year-end charts

Certifications

References

Garth Brooks albums
1995 albums
Albums produced by Allen Reynolds
Capitol Records albums
Canadian Country Music Association Top Selling Album albums